Tagabawa is a Manobo language of Davao City and Mount Apo in Mindanao, the Philippines. Tagabawa is spoken in Cotabato and Davao del Sur provinces, and on the slopes of Mount Apo west of Davao City, The language is spoken by the Bagobo Tagabawa people.

References

External links
 Tagabawa-language texts at Project Gutenberg
Diccionario Bagobo-Español (1892) by Mateo Gisbert – from the University of Michigan Digital Collections

Manobo languages
Languages of Davao del Sur